Creighton Coleman may refer to:
Creighton B. Coleman (born 1956), South Carolina politician
Creighton R. Coleman (1912–1992), Michigan politician and jurist